The TK80 was a home computer produced by Microdigital Eletrônica. A clone of the Sinclair ZX80, it was introduced along with the TK82C in 1981 during the "I Feira Internacional de Informática". There were two versions, one with 1 KB RAM costing Cr$ 68,850 and another with 2 KB costing Cr$73,650.

In the January 1982 issue of Micro Sistemas magazine, Tomas Roberto Kovari, Microdigital's engineer, stated that the machines were being sold with a photocopied manual, while a printed version was being developed. Kovari estimated a potential market for 10000 machines in Brazil, with expected buyers being novelty seekers, students and self employed professionals.

According to some sources, the TK80 was never commercially produced, with only prototypes existing.

Specifications 
Specifications were similar to the original machine:

 CPU: Z80A @ 3.25 MHz
 Memory: ROM: 4 KiB; RAM: 1 or 2 KiB
 Keyboard: 40 keys membrane keyboard
 Display: 32 × 22 text; 64 × 44 semigraphics
 Expansion: 1 slot
 Outputs: 1 TV out (RF modulator, channel 3); cassette tape recorder audio in/out
 Storage: Cassette tape (300 bauds)

References 

Microdigital Eletrônica
Z80
Goods manufactured in Brazil
Sinclair ZX80 clones